Navajyothi College of Arts and Science is an emerging centre for higher education situated at Kannikkalam near Cherupuzha in Kannur district and is managed by CST fathers.

Navajyothi College of Arts and Science is also the best college in Cherupuzha in terms of infrastructure, faculty and academic pursuit.

The college was established in 2000 as an open school and provided undergraduate courses as well. The college got n.o.c. from the Kerala state government in 2010 and is now an affiliated college of Kannur University.

History
St. Thomas Province Trust of the Little Flower Congregation (CST Fathers) established Navajyothi Ashram at Cherupuzha in the year 1995 with the view of providing educational and pastoral support to the rurals in an around Cherupuzha. And it has been running Navajyothi Open School and College since 2000. The felt need of the context and the area made the Trust shift to professional and formal education sphere with an affiliated college named Navajyothi arts and science college.

Navajyothi is an Arts & Science College Affiliated to Kannur University. It was given Noc form the government of Kerala in 2010. The college is located at suburb of Cherupuzha on the verge of Payyannur Rajagiri Road. St. Thomas Province Trust looks after the establishment and functioning of the college.

External links

Christian universities and colleges in India
Arts and Science colleges in Kerala
Colleges affiliated to Kannur University
Universities and colleges in Kannur district
Educational institutions established in 2000
2000 establishments in Kerala